Svartir sandar is the fourth album by the Icelandic band Sólstafir. It was released on October 14, 2011, by Season of Mist. A music video for the song Fjara was made in July 2011 and released in January 2012.

Track listing
Disc 1 (Andvari) 
 "Ljós í stormi" (Lights in a Storm) – 11:35 
 "Fjara" (Beach) – 6:44 
 "Þín orð" (Your Words) – 6:13 
 "Sjúki skugginn" (The Sick Shadow) – 5:07 
 "Æra" (Honour) – 5:02 
 "Kukl" (Humbug) – 5:08

Disc 2 (Gola)
 "Melrakkablús" (Prairie Hound Blues) – 9:58 
 "Draumfari" (Dream Tripper) – 3:40 
 "Stinningskaldi" (Strong Breeze) – 1:15 
 "Stormfari" (Storm Tripper) – 3:37 
 "Svartir sandar" (Black Sands) – 8:22 
 "Djákninn" (The Deacon) – 10:51

Personnel
Sólstafir
Aðalbjörn Tryggvason: guitars, vocals
Sæþór Maríus Sæþórsson: guitars
Svavar Austmann: bass guitar
Guðmundur Óli Pálmason: drums, percussion

Additional personnel
Hljómeyki Choir arranged and conducted by Gunnar Ben
Halldór A. Björnsson: keyboards and electric piano
Jón Björn Rikharðsson: gong
Steinar Sigurðsson: saxophone
Gerður G. Bjarklind: spoken word
Hallgrímur Jón Hallgrímsson: male backing vocal
Ragnheiður Eiriksdottir: female backing vocal

Production
Produced by Aðalbjörn Tryggvason and Fredrik Reinedahl
Recording Engineers: Birgir Jón Birgisson and Elizabeth Carlsson
Mixed by Fredrik Reinedahl
Mastered by Göran Finnberg at The Mastering Room

References

2011 albums
Sólstafir albums
Season of Mist albums